Elisabeth Reichart (born 1953, Steyregg, Upper Austria) is an Austrian author.

Biography 
Reichart's grandmother survived the Nazi occupation of Austria and strongly influenced the life of Reichart. Reichart wrote her dissertation about the Austrian resistance movement and the silence of Austria during World War II. Soon after, she began writing her first novel, February Shadows.

Reichart developed into a well-known Austrian writer after the release of February Shadows, a historical novel which dealt with the Mühlviertler Hasenjagd ("The Rabbit Hunt of the Mill District"), and has since produced five novels, a book of short stories, several dramas, and a collection of radio plays.

Awards
In 1993, she received the Austrian National Prize for the Promotion of Literature and in 1995, she was awarded the prestigious Elias Canetti Grant, named for Nobel Prize winner Elias Canetti. In 2000, she received the Anton Wildgans Prize.

Literary works 
Februarschatten 1984 (February Shadows)
Komm über den See 1988 (Come Across the Lake)
La Valse 1992
Fotze 1993
Nachtmär 1995 (Nighttale)
Das vergessene Lächeln der Amaterasu 1990 (The Forgotten Smile of the Amaterasu)

References

Bibliography 
 DeMeritt, Linda. "The Art of Confronting Taboos." Department of Modern and Classical Languages of Allegheny College. 2000.
 Michaels,  Jennifer E. "Breaking the Silence: Elisabeth Reichart's Protest against the Denial of the Nazi past in Austria." German Studies Review. Vol. 19, No. 1 (1996): pp. 9–27. JSTOR. German Studies Association. March 31, 2010.
 Wolf, Christa. "Afterword." February Shadows. Riverside: Ariadne Press, 1989.

1953 births
Living people
20th-century Austrian novelists
Austrian women novelists
Anton Wildgans Prize winners
20th-century women writers
Psychological fiction writers